Pritchardia woodfordiana is a species of flowering plant in the family Arecaceae. It is found only in Solomon Islands. It may be a form of Pritchardia pacifica.

References

Undescribed plant species
woodfordiana
Flora of the Solomon Islands (archipelago)
Data deficient plants
Endemic flora of the Solomon Islands
Taxonomy articles created by Polbot